Stănești is a commune in Gorj County, Oltenia, Romania. It is composed of ten villages: Alexeni, Bălani, Călești, Curpen, Măzăroi, Obreja, Pârvulești, Stănești, Vaidei and Vălari.

References

Communes in Gorj County
Localities in Oltenia